Sphecotypus is a genus of corinnid sac spiders first described by O. Pickard-Cambridge in 1895.

Species
 it contains four species:
Sphecotypus birmanicus (Thorell, 1897) – Myanmar
Sphecotypus borneensis Yamasaki, 2017 – Malaysia (Borneo)
Sphecotypus niger (Perty, 1833) (type) – Nicaragua to Brazil
Sphecotypus taprobanicus Simon, 1897 – Sri Lanka

References

Araneomorphae genera
Corinnidae
Spiders of Asia